Kenneth C. Anderson may refer to:

 Ken Anderson (wrestler) (born 1976), American professional wrestler
 Kenneth C. Anderson (physician), editor of the medical journal Clinical Cancer Research

See also 
 Kenneth Anderson (disambiguation)